Lee McLeod Janzen (born August 28, 1964) is an American professional golfer who is best known for winning the U.S. Open twice in 1993 and 1998. He currently plays on the PGA Tour Champions, and was an eight-time winner on the PGA Tour.

Early years and amateur career
Janzen was born in Austin, Minnesota, and spent most of his childhood in Baltimore, Maryland, where he played Little League baseball. When Janzen was 12, his father's company transferred him to Florida and his parents started him in golf and tennis, and he continued playing baseball. Janzen liked golf best and started playing that sport exclusively. He won his first tournament at age 15 as a member of the Greater Tampa Junior Golf Association.

Janzen chose to attend a small college – Florida Southern.  In 1985 and 1986, Florida Southern won the Division II national team championship. Janzen was the individual medalist in 1986. He turned professional later that same year.

Professional career
In 1989, Janzen joined the PGA Tour. He has won eight times on the PGA Tour, most notably the 1993 and 1998 U.S. Opens.  In 1993, Janzen defeated Payne Stewart at Baltusrol in Springfield, New Jersey, en route to tying the 72-hole U.S. Open scoring record of 8-under-par. Five years later, he again beat out Stewart to win his second U.S. Open, this time at the Olympic Club in San Francisco. He overcame a five stroke deficit on Sunday, marking the best final-round comeback in a U.S. Open for 25 years since Johnny Miller's win in 1973.

Janzen also notched a victory at The Players Championship in 1995. The Players is a premiere event on the PGA Tour and includes the largest purse of the season. He has been featured in the top 20 of the Official World Golf Ranking.

Janzen had several opportunities to win additional major golf championships. In 1996, he was in contention at both the U.S. Open and PGA Championship before finishing in the top-10 in both events. He finished fourth at the 1997 PGA Championship after sharing the 36-hole lead at Winged Foot in Mamaroneck, New York.

Janzen also played on two American Ryder Cup teams, in 1993 and 1997.

Janzen has lived in various places in Central Florida since becoming a professional golfer. He is a Republican.

Professional wins (12)

PGA Tour wins (8)

PGA Tour playoff record (1–0)

Other wins (2)

Other playoff record (0–1)

PGA Tour Champions wins (2)

PGA Tour Champions playoff record (2–0)

Major championships

Wins (2)

Results timeline

CUT = missed the half way cut
"T" indicates a tie for a place.

Summary

Most consecutive cuts made – 8 (1994 Open Championship – 1996 U.S. Open)
Longest streak of top-10s – 1 (five times)

The Players Championship

Wins (1)

Results timeline

CUT = missed the halfway cut
"T" indicates a tie for a place.

Results in World Golf Championships

1Cancelled due to 9/11

QF, R16, R32, R64 = Round in which player lost in match play
"T" = Tied
NT = No tournament

U. S. national team appearances
Ryder Cup: 1993  (winners), 1997
Dunhill Cup: 1995
Presidents Cup: 1998
Wendy's 3-Tour Challenge (representing PGA Tour): 1993, 1995, 1999

See also
1989 PGA Tour Qualifying School graduates

References

External links

Profile at the Florida Southern College Athletics Hall of Fame

American male golfers
Florida Southern Moccasins men's golfers
PGA Tour golfers
PGA Tour Champions golfers
Winners of men's major golf championships
Ryder Cup competitors for the United States
Golfers from Minnesota
People from Austin, Minnesota
1964 births
Living people